Zalkhan Mosque was a mosque in Yerevan, located in the Shahar quarter.

History 
It was located between Gala and Tepebashi massifs of Yerevan. It is believed that the Zalkhan mosque was built in 1649-1685. According to H. Lynch, it was written on the mosque in the Arabic alphabet in Turkish that the mosque was built in 1687. It is understood that the City Mosque was built after the 1679 earthquake. In 1928, the Great Hall of the City Mosque was demolished and the Yerevan Hotel was built in its place. After reconstruction in 1999, the hotel is now called the Golden Tulip Hotel Yerevan. An archival document from 1949 kept in the State Archives of the Republic of Azerbaijan states that the Zalkhan mosque was used as an exhibition hall. The purpose of the madrasa of the Zalkhan mosque, which has a two-story building and many cells, was changed after the Second World War. At present, the exhibition hall of the House of Artists is located in that building.

References 

Shia mosques in Armenia
Monuments and memorials in Armenia
19th-century mosques
Mosques destroyed by communists
Demolished buildings and structures in Armenia
Buildings and structures demolished in 1928